Kirkbuddo railway station served the village of Kirkbuddo, Angus, Scotland, from 1870 to 1955 on the Dundee and Forfar direct line.

History 
The station was opened on 14 November 1870 by the Caledonian Railway. On the northbound platform was the goods yard, on the west side of the line was the goods yard and at the north end of the northbound platform was the signal box, which opened in 1892. When the footbridge was moved to the south, the waiting room on the northbound platform was enlarged. The station closed on 10 January 1955.

References 

Disused railway stations in Angus, Scotland
Former Caledonian Railway stations
Railway stations in Great Britain opened in 1870
Railway stations in Great Britain closed in 1955
1870 establishments in Scotland
1955 disestablishments in Scotland